The Federal Institute of Pará (IFPA) is an institution of higher, vocational, and middle education maintained by the Brazilian federal government in the state of Pará. The institute has students enrolled in its courses offered across its many campuses in the cities of Belém, Abaetetuba, Altamira, Bragança, Castanhal, Cametá, Capanema, Breves, Tucuruí and Soure.

References

External links
 Official Website of the Pará Federal Institute of Technology

1909 establishments in Brazil
Universities and colleges in Pará
Educational institutions established in 1909
Para